Garfield Blair (born March 24, 1987) is a Jamaican professional basketball player.  He currently plays for Amics Castelló Sports Club of the LEB Oro in Spain.

He has been a member of the Jamaican national basketball team and participated at the 2014 Centrobasket.

References

External links
FIBA Profile (2014 Centrobasket)
Eurobasket.com Profile
NBA D-League Profile

1987 births
Living people
AB Castelló players
American people of Jamaican descent
Basketball players from Orlando, Florida
Jamaican expatriate basketball people in Spain
Jamaican men's basketball players
Shooting guards
Sportspeople from Kingston, Jamaica
Stetson Hatters men's basketball players